Keystone Oaks High School or KO is a public high school in the suburbs of Pittsburgh, Pennsylvania, United States.  It is the only high school in the Keystone Oaks School District.

History
The main building of the high school was built in 1969, four years after the three suburbs of Green Tree, Dormont and Castle Shannon combined their students to form a common school district.  The high school was built on a  tract of land in neighboring Mount Lebanon, just outside the southwest border of Dormont.  The site adjoined the Kelton Avenue Elementary School, which no longer exists.

The name 'Keystone Oaks' refers to the merger of the three school districts:  'key' for the 'door' in Dormont; 'stone' from the 'castle' in Castle Shannon; and 'oak' as a tree in Green Tree.  The name was suggested by Thomas Clark, of the Class of 1965, and was chosen as part of a student competition to name the new school district.

Due to the deteriorating state of the district's Jay Neff Middle School (the original Dormont High School), a new middle school was attached to the old high school in 1996.  This precipitated a massive redesign of the grounds, including the demolition of a little-used outdoor amphitheatre and the construction of a band practice field and new tennis courts. These tennis courts were later repaved in 2006.

Through the summer of 2001 and the 2001/2002 school year, the high school was renovated.

Notable alumni
 Dennis Miller Comedian <ref></ref

References

High schools in Pittsburgh
Educational institutions established in 1969
Public high schools in Pennsylvania
1969 establishments in Pennsylvania